Slovenia competed at the 2012 Summer Paralympics in London, United Kingdom, from 29 August to 9 September 2012. 22 sportsmen represented Slovenia in athletics, cycling, table tennis, volleyball, swimming and shooting.

Medallists

Athletics 

Men's field events

Women's field events

Cycling

Road

Men

Shooting

Swimming 

Men

Table tennis 

Women

Volleyball

Women's tournament
Roster

Group B

5th–8th place semi-finals

5th–6th place match

See also
 Slovenia at the 2012 Summer Olympics

References

Nations at the 2012 Summer Paralympics
2012
Summer Paralympics